Kusaj Khalil (also Romanized as Kūsaj Khalīl, Koosej Khalil, and Kūsaj-e Khalīl; also known as Kūseh Khalīl, Kūseh-ye Khalīl, and Kūsh Khalīl) is a village in Almahdi Rural District, Jowkar District, Malayer County, Hamadan Province, Iran. At the 2006 census, its population was 332, in 75 families.

References 

Populated places in Malayer County